NGC 802 is a lenticular galaxy in the constellation Hydrus. It is about 68 million light-years from the Milky Way and has a diameter of about 20,000 light years. NGC 802 was discovered on November 2, 1834 by the British astronomer John Herschel.

See also 
 List of NGC objects (1–1000)

References 

Lenticular galaxies
Hydrus (constellation)
0802
007505